John David Moore (19 May 1943 – 17th November 2004) was an English cricketer.  Moore was a right-handed batsman who bowled right-arm medium pace.  He was born in Newcastle-under-Lyme, Staffordshire.

Moore made his debut for Staffordshire in the 1961 Minor Counties Championship against Norfolk.  He played Minor counties cricket for Staffordshire from 1961 to 1980, making 123 Minor Counties Championship appearances.  He made his List A debut against Glamorgan in the 1971 Gillette Cup.  He made five further List A appearances for Staffordshire, the last coming against Sussex in the 1978 Gillette Cup.  In his six List A matches for Staffordshire, he scored 79 runs at an average of 15.80, with a high score of 49*.

Playing for Staffordshire allowed him to represent Minor Counties North, making his debut for the team in the 1975 Benson & Hedges Cup against Derbyshire.  He made three further List A appearances for the team, the last of which came against Lancashire in the same competition.  He scored 39 runs at an average of 13.00, with a high score of 28.  He also made two List A appearances for Minor Counties East in the 1977 Benson & Hedges Cup against Essex and Middlesex.He also played club cricket at Wolverhampton and Penn cricket club in the 80's / 90's becoming 1st team Captain with Penn and helping in the youth development of the club.He once said "go with the pace of the ball if they are bowling fast use the pace of the ball to score and glance it rather than hit it hard "the ball will do the rest".

References

External links
John Moore at ESPNcricinfo
John Moore at CricketArchive

1943 births
Sportspeople from Newcastle-under-Lyme
English cricketers
Staffordshire cricketers
Minor Counties cricketers
2004 deaths